Mario Goico (born July 24, 1945) is a former Republican member of the Kansas House of Representatives who represented Wichita, Kansas.

Goico represented the 100th district from 2003 to 2013, and the 94th district from 2013 to 2017. Goico was first elected in 2002 but did not run for reelection in 2016. He had no primary or general election opposition in 2010–2014. He served as the assistant majority leader in 2015–2017. He had a lifetime rating of 88% from the American Conservative Union.

An aeronautical engineer, Goico is married to Susan Goico and is a native of Cuba.

Committee membership
 Taxation
 Vision 2020
 Veterans, Military and Homeland Security (Vice-Chair)
 Financial Institutions
 Local Government
 Joint Committee on Kansas Security (Chair)

Major donors
The top 5 donors to Goico's 2008 campaign:
1. Astrazeneca 	$1,000 	
2. Kansas Medical Society 	$750 	
3. HSBC North America 	$550 	
4. Kansas Chamber of Commerce & Industry 	$500 	
5. Sunflower Electric Power Corp 	$500

References

External links
 Official Website
 Kansas Legislature - Mario Goico
 Project Vote Smart profile
 Kansas Votes profile
 State Surge - Legislative and voting track record
 Campaign contributions: 2002, 2004, 2006, 2008

1945 births
Living people
21st-century American politicians
American politicians of Cuban descent
Hispanic and Latino American state legislators
Republican Party members of the Kansas House of Representatives
Wichita State University alumni